Wendy Fleming  is a New Zealand expert on Alzheimer’s disease and dementia. In 2018 she was made a Companion of the Royal Society Te Apārangi in recognition of her contributions to the promotion of dementia research in New Zealand.

Life 
Fleming has a background in nursing, specialising in aged care. From the 1970s to the 1990s she was a member of several national nursing, hospital and aged care committees and advocated that people with dementia should have high-quality care based on world-class research. In 2004 she established the Alzheimer’s New Zealand Charitable Trust, and has held the positions of chair of Alzheimer’s New Zealand and honorary vice-president of Alzheimer's Disease International. Fleming is a member of the Advisory Board for the Centre for Brain Research at the University of Auckland.

References

 Living people
 Companions of the Royal Society of New Zealand
 Year of birth missing (living people)
New Zealand nurses